General Sir Henry Edward ap Rhys Pryce, KCB, CMG, DSO (30 November 1874 – 21 June 1950) was a Welsh officer in the Indian Army who served Master-General of the Ordnance in British India.

Early life and education

Pryce was born in Cuttack, British India, the son of Lt.-Col. Douglas Davidson Pryce and Georgie Hunter Carter. His younger brother was soldier of fortune Carol Ap Rhys Pryce. He was educated at Trinity College, Glenalmond, and the Royal Military College, Sandhurst.

Military career
Pryce began his military career on the unattached list in 1895. He served his first year in India with the 1st Battalion, the Duke of Cornwall's Light Infantry, followed by a posting to the 18th Infantry, the 10th/9th Jats, and the Supply and Transport Corps. As a master of transport, he commanded a mule corps in the British expedition to Tibet, 1903–04. He later authored Transport Training Notes, which served for many years as a valuable handbook to the corps. He then graduated from the Staff College, Quetta, and in 1912 began a distinguished career at Army Headquarters at Shimla.

He served in the First World War during which he was awarded the DSO and mentioned in dispatches seven times.

Pryce became Commandant of the Senior Officers' School, Belgaum in December 1920 and Director of Supplies and Transport in India in 1927. He went on to be General Officer Commanding Presidency and Assam District in October 1929, General Officer Commanding Deccan District in December 1930 and Master-General of the Ordnance in India in April 1934. He was promoted to full general in May 1936.

He was appointed Honorary Colonel of 99th (London Welsh) Heavy Anti-Aircraft Regiment, Royal Artillery, when that Territorial Army unit was raised in 1939, and he regularly visited it during World War II.

Personal life

Pryce married Alice Louise Pughe, daughter of Robertson Francis Home Pughe, in 1900. They had two sons, Meyrick Home ap Rhys Pryce (1902–1965) and Mervyn Aleck ap Rhys Pryce (1905–1940), who was killed in action in France while serving in the Royal Air Force Volunteer Reserve.

References

1874 births
1950 deaths
British Indian Army generals
Knights Commander of the Order of the Bath
Companions of the Order of St Michael and St George
Companions of the Distinguished Service Order
People educated at Glenalmond College
Graduates of the Royal Military College, Sandhurst
British people in colonial India
Military personnel of British India
Duke of Cornwall's Light Infantry officers
Graduates of the Staff College, Quetta
Indian Army generals of World War I
Commandants of the Senior Officers' School, Belgaum